Georgia State Route 50 Connector may refer to:

 Georgia State Route 50 Connector (Albany): a former connector that existed in Albany
 Georgia State Route 50 Connector (Jekyll Island): a former connector that existed in Jekyll Island

050 Connector